Britannia was built in South Carolina (probably Charleston) in 1772. Prior to 1798, Britannia sailed between London and South Carolina, or simply served as a transport. In 1798 she changed ownership and began a sequence of whaling voyages. Between 1798 and 1807 she made a number of whaling voyages to the South Seas whale fishery, and the coast of South Africa. On one of those voyages a French privateer captured her, but Britannia was recaptured almost immediately. Between 1808 and 1816, the last year in which she is listed, she returned to operating as a London-based transport.

Origins
Although Britannia was built in South Carolina, she does not appear in a list of ships registered in the colony between 1734 and 1780, suggesting that she may have been built for the British market. At the time, building ships in America was frequently cheaper than building them in Britain. She first appeared in Lloyd's Register for 1776 as a London-based transport.

Career

Merchantman and transport

Whaler
In 1798 Britannia changed ownership, underwent repairs, and began what would become a number of voyages to the Southern Fishery. On 16 January 1798 Captain E. Clark sailed her for New Holland. On 7 August 1799 Britannia was "all well" at Smoaky Coast, near the Cape of Good Hope. She put into Cape Town for supplies on 29 August. Then on 10 October she was at St Helena. She returned to Britain on 13 January 1800.

In 1800 J. Mills (or Miles) replaced Clark. James Miles received a letter of marque on 14 March 1800. Britannia was reported "well" off the coast of Chile 23 April 1801.

Britannia left again on 11 January 1803 with J. Miles, master. She was reported 4 November to have been at St Helena. In December she was off Ireland, in distress. As she was returning to Britain and in the Channel, the French privateer Bellona captured her. However, the frigate  recaptured Britannia on 1 December, and sent her into Plymouth, where she arrived on 12 December. She finally completed her voyage on 27 April 1804.

In 1804 Hussey replaced Miles as master of Britannia. Ammiell (or Ariel) Hussey received a letter of marque on 31 August 1804. Britannia also underwent repair for damages. Lloyd's Register shows Britannia as being engaged in the South Seas fishery in 1805. The only report of the voyage was that on 22 May 1805 Britannia, "Hussy", master, was well around Cape Horn at latitude 6°S. The report goes on to say that she had been informed of the war, and that four British vessels had been detained in port.

Captain Hussey sailed from Britain on 4 March 1806, bound for California. In August Britannia was reported off the coast of California with 30 tons of sperm oil and 150 tons of elephant seal oil. She intended to return home via Cape Horn. She arrived back in Britain on 16 April 1807.

Transport
In 1808 Captain Weatherhead replaced Hussey as captain of Britannia. The next year ownership changed to Raines & Co., and Britannias trade returned to London transport.  This entry continues almost unchanged until 1816, which is the last year in which she is listed. It's unknown if the vessel sank, was sold, or scrapped, so her fate remains unknown.

Notes

Citations

References
 
 
 

1772 ships
Whaling ships
Sealing ships
Captured ships
Age of Sail merchant ships
Merchant ships of the United Kingdom